Last Call is the fourth studio album by American rapper Rittz. The album was released on September 29, 2017, by Strange Music. In the album first week it sold 49,000 copies. It is also the final album under his contract with Strange Music.

Singles
The album's first single "Indestructible" was released on August 17, 201, followed by the album's second single, "Dork Rap", on September 13, 2017.

Track listing

Charts

References

External links

2017 albums
Rittz albums
Strange Music albums
Albums produced by Seven (record producer)